KH Tower (Malay: Menara KH, formerly known as Promet Tower) is a 36-storey,  tall skyscraper in Kuala Lumpur, Malaysia. It was also noted to be the first glass-cladded skyscraper in the country.

See also 
List of tallest buildings in Malaysia
List of tallest buildings in Kuala Lumpur

References 

Buildings and structures in Kuala Lumpur
Office buildings completed in 1983
1983 establishments in Malaysia
20th-century architecture in Malaysia